The 2018–19 Emporia State Lady Hornets basketball team represented Emporia State University in the 2018–19 NCAA Division II women's basketball season, which was the 45th Lady Hornets basketball season. The Lady Hornets were led by first-year head coach Toby Wynn. The team played their home games on Slaymaker Court William L. White Auditorium in Emporia, Kansas, the home court since 1974. Emporia State is a member of the Mid-America Intercollegiate Athletics Association.

Preseason outlook 
The Lady Hornets enter the 2018–19 season after finishing with a 17–11 overall, 11–8 in conference play last season under Jory Collins. Losing in the MIAA Tournament caused the team's first Tournament loss in 16 games, winning the tournament for the past 5 years.

Collins announced his resignation on March 12, 2018 to become an assistant coach for former boss and former Lady Hornet basketball coach, Brandon Schneider, at the University of Kansas. On April 6, 2018, Toby Wynn, head coach of the Seward County Saints women's basketball program, was announced as the seventh head coach in Lady Hornet history. Wynn had a winning record of 349–84  while at Seward County and won four Kansas Jayhawk Community College Conference championships.

On October 9, 2018, the Lady Hornets were chosen to finish third in the coaches poll and fourth in the media poll in the MIAA.

2018–19 Roster

Media
The Lady Hornets basketball games are broadcast on KFFX-FM, Mix 104.9.

Schedule
Source:

|-
! colspan="12" style="" | Exhibition

|-
! colspan="12" style="" | Non-conference regular season

|-
! colspan="12" style="" | MIAA regular season

 
|-
! colspan="6" style="" | 2019 MIAA Tournament

|-
! colspan="6" style="" | 2019 NCAA Central Regional Tournament

References

Emporia State Lady Hornets basketball seasons
Emporia State Lady Hornets basketball
Emporia State Lady Hornets basketball
Emporia